Kholodny Yar Republic, Cold Ravine Republic or Kholodnoyarsk Republic (1919–1922) was a self-proclaimed state formation, partisan movement, which ran on part of the lands of the former Ukrainian People's Republic (UPR — or Ukrainian National Republic, UNR), in the Chyhyryn district of the Kyiv province (now Cherkasy Raion of Cherkasy Oblast), in the area of the Kholodny Yar forest tract. The village of Melnyky was its capital. It had a 15,000-strong army composed of peasants and soldiers from the UNR army, which was defeated by the White Army in Podolia earlier. 

Kholodny Yar Republic was the last territory in which Ukrainians continued to fight for an independent Ukrainian state before the incorporation of Ukraine into the Soviet Union as the Ukrainian SSR. Thus it was an important part of the Ukrainian War of Independence.

During the Soviet era, the history of this entity and its figures was silenced or distorted because, according to many researchers, it could lead to an increase in undesirable attitudes from the point of view of the authorities in society.

History 
In 1918–1922, the Orthodox Motronynsky Monastery became the center of the Ukrainian insurgent movement against the invaders (German occupiers and Russian "white" and "red" invaders), led by the Chuchupaky brothers. Because of the coup, at the request of the abbot, residents of the village of Melnyky formed a self-defense unit to protect the monastery from looting. The detachment was headed by Oleksiy Chuchupak and consisted of 22 people.

Later, in 1919, the detachment turned into a regiment, and Vasyl Chuchupak was elected commander of the regiment (before that he was an ensign of the Russian Imperial Army, and even earlier – a village teacher). His brother Petro Chuchupak became chief of staff of the regiment. During the occupation of Ukraine by the Denikin's troops, the regiment took part in their expulsion from Cherkasy. The regiment was constantly replenished and its number reached 2,000 people.

Subsequently, the Kholodny Yar Republic was formed. Its territory covered more than 25 surrounding villages and had about 15,000 peasant insurgent army, whose soldiers called themselves Cossacks, and their commanders — otamans (in memory of the military tradition of the Cossacks).

In November 1919, the otaman of the Katerynoslav and Kherson regions, Andriy Hulyi-Gulenko, arrived in Kholodny Yar. The Chief Otaman of the Kholodny Yar was Vasyl Chuchupak. Otamans Gerasym Nesterenko-Orel, Tryfon Gladchenko, Mykhailo Melashko, Sirko, Oko, Chorny Voron (Chornoguzko), Mefodiy Golyk-Zalizniak, Semen Vovk, Oleksa Kotsyubenko, Kalyuzhny, D. Kanatenko, 1st and 2nd Olexandrian Regiments were subordinated to him.

After the death of Vasyl Chuchupaka, the Kholodnoyarsk Republic was headed by the Deputy Chief Otaman, Ivan Derkach, a member of the Kholodnoyarsk Insurgent Committee. He commanded the armed forces of the Kholodny Yar region during the anti-Soviet uprising in the spring and autumn of 1920.

In March 1920, the Steppe Division of the UPR Army, numbering between 12,000 and 18,000 men, liberated Kherson from the Bolsheviks and led a successful offensive to the west (via Bilozerka) along the Kamyanka-Yehradivka-Ruzhychiv-Chyhyryn line. The division stopped in the Kholodny Yar tract, where it joined the Kholodny Yar Armed Forces.

On 24 September 1920, in Medvedivka, where Koliivshchyna once began, a meeting of the Kholodny Yar Otamans took place, attended by commanders of the Steppe Division and otamans of other regions. At this meeting, Kostya Blakytny was elected Chief Otaman of all insurgent units of the Kholodny Yar and its environs.

The influence of the Kholodny Yar was not limited to Cherkasy region. The authorities of the Kholodnoyarsk Republic were also recognized by coastal villages (up the Dnipro to Cherkasy: Ratseve, Tinky, Borovytsia, Topylivka, Sagunivka, Khudyaky, Buzhyn, Lesky, and others).

Otaman Gerasim Nesterenko-Orel was the last of the Chief Otamans of the Kholodny Yar elected at the general representative congress of all otamans of the republic.

The fall of the Republic 

One of the stages of the Cheka's special operation to liquidate the Kholodnoyarsk Republic was the so-called "amnesty" promised to those insurgents who would surrender voluntarily.

The transition took place in the village Zhabotyn on the 4th (in other documents on the 7th) August 1921. Ivan Petrenko, Chairman of the Kholodnoyarsk District Headquarters, Otamans Derkach, Vasylenko, Oleksa Chuchupak, S. Chuchupak, Tovkachenko (Tovkach), Temny, Lytvynenko, Pinchenko, and more than 20 Otamans and 76 security guards, including Ponomarenko and Wislow, were amnestied. After that, the "amnestied" wrote a letter to the otamans Khmara, Zagorodny, Zaliznyak and others calling for an end to the struggle and the transition to the side of the Ukrainian Soviet government.

On 29 September 1922, the Cheka lured some atamans to a pseudo-gathering in Zvenyhorodka. They were allegedly convened to prepare for an all-Ukrainian uprising. Many atamans were arrested there.

The Russian Bolsheviks planned to eliminate the amnestied otamans from the very beginning, but did not dare to do so until November, when they set out to eliminate not only the otamans but also the entire insurgent, "suspicious" and "sympathetic" element in the Kholodny Yar area. Very soon, repression against the population became the main means of combating the insurgency. Families of insurgents and "kurkul" ("kulak") elements who helped the insurgents were evicted. Property, inventory and food supplies were confiscated from them. All able-bodied people were sent to labor units, disabled people were placed in cities and towns.

The Kholodny Yar Republic lasted until 1922, when the Bolsheviks deceitfully lured the otamans into an ambush.

On 9 February 1923 Kholodny Yar Republic insurgents, all sentenced to death, took part in a four-hour battle/failed prison uprising in Kyiv's Lukyanivska Prison that killed 38 prisoners and one Red Army soldier.

Legacy 

In the 21st century the Kholodny Republic flag was used during the Euromaidan demonstrations and by the Azov Battalion. In January 2018 the 93rd Mechanized Brigade of the Ukrainian army received the honorary name "Kholodny Yar" as reference to the Kholodny Yar partisan movement.

In art

Literature 
 "Cold Yar" or "Kholodny Yar" — a historical documentary novel by Yurii Horlis-Horsky. The book ended at the 1921 events.
 "The Black Raven" or "Chornyi Voron" — fictional continuation of Yurii Horlis-Horsky's work by Vasyl Shkliar.

Films 
 “Cold Yar. The freedom to Ukraine – or death!” — the documentary film based on the novel by Yurii Horlis-Horsky.
 "The Black Raven" - the film based on the novel written by Vasyl Shkliar. The release date is the 5th of December 2019. It is must mention that there were a few attempts to show this historical period prior to 2019, namely, on the 26th of 2018 was released the film "Traitor", where this time events are mentioned, but rather indirectly. Regarding the film "The Black Raven", it was directed by Taras Tkachenko, the main role (Black Raven) is played by Taras Tsymbalyk. Plot: The Black Raven, a former soldier and a holder of three Georgievsky medals - Ivan Chornous. He arrives in Kholodny Yar with his young wife to visit his father. He was not about to participate in the war, however, his father's murder by Red Army became the turning point for him. Consequently, he decides to join the guerrillas to revenge. Very soon he becomes the otaman.

See also
 Yuriy Gorlis-Gorsky

References

External links 
 In the Footsteps of Fallen Heroes

Ukraine in the Russian Civil War
Former republics
Insurgent groups in Europe
Ukrainian People's Republic
History of Cherkasy Oblast
1919 in Ukraine
Political history of Ukraine
1919 establishments in Ukraine
1922 disestablishments in Ukraine
States and territories established in 1919
States and territories disestablished in 1922
Anti-Soviet resistance
Ukrainian resistance movement
Ukrainian anti-Soviet resistance movement
Rebellions in the Soviet Union
Post–Russian Empire states